The following is a list of county roads in Pinellas County, Florida.  All county roads are maintained by the county in which they reside, however not all of them are marked with standard MUTCD approved county road shields.

County routes in Pinellas County

References

FDOT Map of Pinellas County, Florida
FDOT GIS data, accessed January 2014
Pinellas County Code of Ordinances: Chapter 170 Section 198

 
County